The 1924 All-Big Ten Conference football team consists of American football players selected to the All-Big Ten Conference teams chosen by various selectors for the 1924 Big Ten Conference football season.

Ends
 Cookie Cunningham, Ohio State (BE-1; BI; DI-1; HC-2; IN-1; LD-1; WE-2)
 Lowell Otte, Iowa (BE-1; BI; DI-2; HC-1; IN-1; LD-2; WE-1)
 Chuck Kassel, Illinois (DI-1; WE-1)
 Steve Polaski, Wisconsin (BE-2; HC-2; IN-3; LD-1, DI-2)
 Rokusek, Illinois (HC-1; IN-2; LD-2)
 Walter H. Seidel, Northwestern (WE-2)
 Dick Romey, Iowa (BE-2)
 Fred Just, Minnesota (IN-2)
 Tom Hogan, Purdue (IN-3)

Tackles
 Franklin Gowdy, Chicago (BE-1; BI; DI-1; HC-2; IN-1; LD-1; WE-1)
 John W. Hancock, Iowa (BE-1; HC-1; IN-1; LD-1; WE-2)
 Ted Cox, Minnesota (BI; LD-2; WE-1; BE-2; DI-1; HC-1; IN-3)
 Tom Edwards, Michigan (BE-2)
 Henderson, Chicago (WE-2)
 Richard L. Hall, Illinois (IN-2)
 Jack Harris, Wisconsin (DI-2; IN-2; HC-2 [fullback]; WE-2 [halfback])
 Ledrue Galloway, Iowa (DI-2)
 Louis Gross, Minnesota (HC-2)
 Ferd Wellman, Purdue (IN-3)

Guards
 Joe Pondelik, Chicago (BE-1; BI; DI-1; HC-1; IN-1; LD-1; WE-1)
 George Abramson, Minnesota (BE-2; DI-1; IN-1; LD-1; WE-1)
 Edward Slaughter, Michigan (BE-1; BI; DI-2; HC-1; IN-2; LD-2; WE-3)
 Adolph Bieberstein, Wisconsin (BE-2; HC-2; IN-2)
 Charles W. Parsons, Northwestern (WE-2)
 Harold O. Steele, Michigan (WE-2)
 Henderson, Chicago (LD-2)
 Louis F. Slimmer, Illinois (HC-2; IN-3)
 Pokrass, Chicago (DI-2; IN-3)

Centers
 Ralph Claypool, Purdue (IN-1; DI-1; HC-2; LD-1; WE-1)
 Robert J. Brown, Michigan (BE-1; HC-1; WE-3)
 Thomas Butler, Indiana (BE-2; BI; IN-2; LD-2)
 Tim Lowry, Northwestern (WE-2)
 Oscar Teckemeyer, Wisconsin (DI-2; IN-3)

Quarterbacks
 Leland Parkin, Iowa (BE-1; BI [halfback]; DI-2; HC-1; IN-1; LD-1; WE-1)
 Tod Rockwell, Michigan (BE-2; HC-2; IN-2; WE-2)
 Max J. Lorber, Indiana (BI; IN-3; WE-3)
 Malcolm Graham, Minnesota (DI-1)
 Harry A. Hall, Illinois (LD-2)

Halfbacks
 Ralph Baker, Northwestern (BE-1; DI-1; HC-1; IN-1; LD-1; WE-1)
 Red Grange, Illinois (BE-1; BI; DI-1; HC-1; IN-1; LD-1; WE-1)
 Rudolph Bahr, Purdue (HC-2; IN-2; WE-2)
 Wally McIlwain, Illinois (LD-2)
 Benny Friedman, Michigan (WE-3)
 Joseph F. Sloate, Indiana (WE-3)
 Wilbur Scantlebury, Iowa (IN-3)
 Herb Steger, Michigan (DI-2; IN-3)
 Thomas, Chicago (DI-2)

Fullbacks
 Cully Lidberg, Minnesota (BE-1; HC-1; LD-1)
 Clarence Schutte, Minnesota (BE-2 [halfback]; DI-1; HC-2 [halfback]; IN-2 [halfback]; LD-2 [halfback]; WE-2)
 McCarty, Chicago (BE-2; BI; IN-1)
 Harry Thomas, Chicago (BE-2 [halfback]; WE-1)
 Earl Britton, Illinois (IN-2; LD-2; WE-3)
 Robert H. Wienecke, Northwestern (DI-2; IN-3)

See also
1924 College Football All-America Team

Key

BE = Billy Evans

BI = Bill Ingram, Indiana head football coach

DI = Daily Illini

HC = Hank Casserly, sporting editor of the Capital Times in Madison, Wisconsin

IN = The Indianapolis News

LD = Larry Dailey

WE = Walter Eckersall

Bold = Consensus first-team selection of a majority of selectors

References

1924 Big Ten Conference football season
All-Big Ten Conference football teams